Jeryl Henry Braxton Sasser (born February 13, 1979) is an American former professional basketball player who last played for Al Arabi in Kuwait. Sasser played college basketball for the SMU Mustangs and professionally in the NBA for the Orlando Magic.

Born in Dallas, Texas, Sasser graduated from Justin F. Kimball High School and played college basketball at Southern Methodist University.  He was selected by the Orlando Magic as the 22nd pick in the 2001 NBA Draft.

In two seasons for the Magic (his only in the NBA) he averaged 2.5 points and 2.3 rebounds per game. Sasser's final NBA game was played in Game 7 of the Eastern Conference First Round on May 4, 2003. In that game, Orlando would drop the series to the Detroit Pistons, losing Game 7 93 - 108, with Sasser recording 3 points and 1 rebound.

He also played with the Yakima Sun Kings of the Continental Basketball Association, and with French Pro A team Élan Béarnais Pau-Orthez. In November 2005, Sasser signed for Bnei HaSharon in Israel replacing injured Cookie Belcher, but he was released after two games. From 2007 to 2009, he played for Al Arabi in Kuwait, and was a Kuwait League Champion in 2008.

Jeryl Sasser is the younger brother of former NBA player Jason Sasser.

Notes

External links
Player bio - NBA.com
College & NBA stats @ basketballreference.com
Player Profile - HoopsHype.com
Player Profile - Safsal.co.il

1979 births
Living people
African-American basketball players
American expatriate basketball people in France
American expatriate basketball people in Israel
American expatriate basketball people in Qatar
American men's basketball players
Basketball players from Dallas
Bnei HaSharon players
Élan Béarnais players
Israeli Basketball Premier League players
Orlando Magic draft picks
Orlando Magic players
Shooting guards
SMU Mustangs men's basketball players
Yakama Sun Kings players
21st-century African-American sportspeople
20th-century African-American sportspeople